Burke Day (April 12, 1954 – March 5, 2017) was an American politician and author.

Early life and education
Cecil Burke Day, Jr was born in Jacksonville, North Carolina to Cecil B. Day and Marian (Deen) Uldine Smith Day. One of four sons born to the couple. His father was a real estate developer, and founder of the Days Inn motel chain. Young Day went to Mercer University in Atlanta, Georgia. He later moved to Tybee Island, Georgia, site of his father's first Days Inn, where he worked in real estate and investments.

Political career
Day was first elected to public office as a member of the Tybee Island City Council. He served on the Council from 1991 to 1994. In 1994 he was elected to the Georgia House of Representatives as a Republican  representing District 153. He took office in January 1995 at a time when his brother, Clinton M. Day, served as a member of the Georgia State Senate. Burke Day continued to serve in the Georgia House for 8 consecutive terms (16 years), until January 2011. Day served on the Appropriations, Defense & Veterans Affairs, and Public Safety & Homeland Security committees. He was chairman of Georgia’s Homeland Security and Public Safety. He was perhaps best known for the Stephens-Day legislation, which froze the taxable value of residential property at the time the property was purchased, protecting homeowners from being taxed out of their homes when property values went up.

Later years
Day wrote a book about his father, who died at age 44. It tells the story of Cecil B. Day, Sr., and how he built the Days Inn motel chain. Day by Day: The Story of Cecil B. Day and his Simple Formula for Success was published in 2000. Burke Day died at his home in Tybee Island, Georgia on March 5, 2017, from complications of a stroke. Day also suffered from muscular dystrophy.

Notes

External links
 Find a Grave

1954 births
2017 deaths
People from Jacksonville, North Carolina
People from Chatham County, Georgia
Mercer University alumni
Businesspeople from Georgia (U.S. state)
Georgia (U.S. state) city council members
Republican Party members of the Georgia House of Representatives
20th-century American businesspeople